Zulma Yugar (born  January 6, 1952 in Oruro, Bolivia) is a Bolivian politician and folk singer with international recognition and influence. She has served as Minister of Culture of Bolivian President Evo Morales' second term.

Yugar served on the jury for the UNESCO program Masterpieces of the Oral and Intangible Heritage of Humanity and is credited by her friend Mr. R. Albro with lobbying successfully for the Oruro Carnival to be proclaimed a masterpiece in 2001.

Yugar has been Director for the Promotion of Culture within the Ministry of Culture, President of the Bolivian Association of Artists and Musicians, and President of the Bolivian National Council of Popular and Traditional Culture. She has received numerous awards and is a UNESCO Artist for Peace.

Discography
Embrujo Lyra 	1969		
 Joya Del Folklore 	1974		
 Piel Morena 		1981		
Kutimuy 	1982		
Zulma Yugar 	1982		
Zulma 	1984		
Zulma Yugar 1986		
Abriendo Brecha 	1988		
Imillita 	1988		
Compartiendo Talentos 	1990		
K´oli Pankarita - Dulce Florcita 	1991		
Zulma Yugar / Gerardo Arias* - Nosotros 	1995		
Zulma* Y Gerardo* - Primero Lo Nuestro 	2001		
Zulma Yugar Interpreta A Rafael Arias* 	2012

Notes

External links
 Wilson García Mérida, La artística historia de Zulma Yugar, Los Tiempos, October 22, 2006 - in Spanish
 Smithsonian Center for Folklife and Cultural Heritage
 Zulma Yugar official website

1952 births
Living people
20th-century Bolivian women singers
21st-century Bolivian politicians
21st-century Bolivian women politicians
Bolivian folk singers
Culture ministers of Bolivia
People from Oruro, Bolivia
Women government ministers of Bolivia